Nodezilla is a peer-to-peer network software written in C++ (core, aka Network Agent) and Java (GUI), and the GUI part is released under the GNU General Public License. It attempts to provide anonymity.

Features 
Technically, Nodezilla is a secured, distributed and fault-tolerant routing system (aka Grid network). Its main purpose is to serve as a link for distributed services built on top of it (like chat, efficient video multicast streaming, file sharing, secured file store ...).

Nodezilla provides cache features; any server may create a local replica of any data object. These local replicas provide faster access and robustness to network partitions. They also reduce network congestion by localizing access traffic. It is assumed that any server in the infrastructure may crash, leak information, or become compromised, therefore in order to ensure data protection, redundancy and TLS encryption are used. As the developers have not published the source code of the Network Agent yet, no independent validation of the provided level of anonymity has been performed.

It currently offers three services:
 Anonymous file sharing
 Hierarchical multimedia streaming
 Digital photo sharing with selected friends.

The project also offers a plugin for Vuze, the popular BitTorrent Client, enabling users to publish and distribute .torrent files without index nor tracker web pages.

See also 
Anonymous P2P

References 

Anonymous file sharing networks

File sharing software